Patchway railway station is on the South Wales Main Line, serving the town of Patchway and village of Stoke Gifford in South Gloucestershire, England. Its three letter station code is PWY.

The station once had large buildings and a goods yard, but these were demolished in the late 20th century, with small brick shelters built in their place. The line through Patchway has recently been electrified as part of the 21st-century modernisation of the Great Western Main Line.

Description 
Patchway railway station is located in the Patchway area of South Gloucestershire, within the Bristol conurbation. There is a large Rolls-Royce industrial area to the west of the station, while the area to the north and east is primarily residential. To the south is a large amount of railway land, including the Filton Triangle depot. The station is just north of Patchway Junctions 1 and 2, where the lines from Bristol Parkway, Filton Abbey Wood and Henbury converge.

The station is on a rough north–south alignment, curving towards the west at the north end. There are two platforms, separated by two running lines and connected by an open footbridge. Platform 1, on the east side of the station and adjacent to the Up Tunnel track, is for trains towards Filton Abbey Wood and Bristol Parkway. Platform 2, on the west side and adjacent to the Down Tunnel track, is for trains towards Pilning. The line through Patchway has a loading gauge of W8, and handles over 15 million train tonnes per year. It is not electrified, though it is planned to be electrified as part of the 21st-century modernisation of the Great Western Main Line.

The main access to the station is from Station Road to the east, however there is also a set of steps and a turnstile into the industrial estate to the west. Facilities at the station are minimal – there are small brick shelters on each platform, but no facilities for buying tickets. There are customer help points, giving next train information for both platforms. A small car park with 15 spaces, and racks for four bicycles, is on the east side of the station on Station Road. CCTV cameras are in operation at the station. Step-free access is available to both platforms following completion of a new footbridge with lifts.

From 2002 to 2014, annual passenger numbers at Patchway more than quintupled, from 16,898 to 92,540, and the station was noted in 2013 as having a high growth trend. However, these numbers are still fairly low: Patchway is the 1,730th busiest station in Great Britain (of 2,540); and the fifth busiest station in South Gloucestershire, busier only than Pilning.

Services

Patchway is managed by Great Western Railway, which operates all services from the station. On Saturdays there is a similar level of service throughout most of the day, with one train per hour in each direction between Cardiff and Taunton.

The standard journey time to Bristol Temple Meads is 13 minutes, and to Cardiff Central is 45 minutes.

History

At New Passage, passengers were transferred to a ferry to cross the Severn to continue on into Wales. The line, engineered by Isambard Kingdom Brunel, was built as single track  broad gauge. The station was only a small structure, and very little is known about it. There were initially six trains per day on weekdays in each direction, with three trains per day on Sundays. The BSWUR was amalgamated with the Great Western Railway (GWR), which had from the beginning operated all BSWUR services, in 1868; and in 1873 the line was converted to  standard gauge. Although the line made travel from Bristol to Wales easier, the change from train to ferry to train was inconvenient, and so a tunnel was built under the Severn. To cope with the anticipated increase in demand, it was decided that the line should be increased to twin track. Trains uphill towards Bristol would use the new line, while trains downhill towards Wales would continue to use the steeper, original track. The deviation left the two tracks at Patchway at significantly different levels, and so made the original site impractical for a station. A boulder and information board marks the site of the original station.

The new station opened on 10 August 1885, and was originally known as "Patchway & Stoke Gifford", but reverted to "Patchway" from 27 October 1908. The station was on a north–south alignment and had two platforms, separated by two running lines, with a third line, a goods loop, behind the western platform. There was a goods yard to the south of the station on the eastern side, with an adjacent signal box. As now, the eastern platform was for trains towards Bristol, the western platform for trains towards Wales. The station buildings were of a standard 1880s GWR design, with tall chimneys and fretted wooden canopies. The main building was on the eastern platform, containing the booking office, toilets, and waiting rooms. A matching brick shelter with canopy was built on the western platform. The eastern platform also had a "bicycle house" at the northern end. A large covered and glazed footbridge linked the two platforms. The goods yard included two sidings: a short, south-facing one adjacent to a loading dock; and a longer north-facing one. There was also a weigh bridge and a coal office. At the north end of the station was a south-facing siding and an oil store. The station did not have a dedicated approach road as it was adjacent to a road connecting Gloucester Road to the west and Gypsy Patch Lane to the south. This road subsequently became known as Station Road.

In 1900, almost all trains from London to Wales travelled via Bath and Bristol, with some still routed via . However, the final  to Bristol were relatively slow and congested, so a new route was built further north, the GWR's Badminton Line, now part of the South Wales Main Line, running from Wootton Bassett Junction to a junction just south of Patchway. The new line opened in 1903, and allowed faster services to Wales. There was a new triangular junction between Patchway and Filton, with the new line coming in from the east. As part of the work, the station signal box was closed, replaced by a larger one closer to the junction on 19 October 1902. The new signal box would later become one of only a few to be double glazed, due to the noise from jet engine testing from the Bristol Siddeley Aero-Engines factory (now the Rolls-Royce factory) opposite the box. The Henbury Loop Line opened in 1910, connecting  to the main lines south of Patchway.

When the railways were nationalised in 1948, Patchway came under the aegis of the Western Region of British Railways. In 1949, there were 11 trains towards South Wales and 13 towards Bristol each weekday, with three trains per day in each direction on Sundays. However, by 1965 this had reduced to eight trains on weekdays towards South Wales and six towards Bristol, with no Sunday service. Traffic levels fell - the station was closed to goods traffic on 5 July 1965, and subsequently had all staff withdrawn on 14 October 1968. The goods loop was taken up and the station buildings demolished, replaced by small brick shelters. The structure of the footbridge remained, but the roof was removed. The goods yard was repurposed as vehicle storage.

In 1974, when the Local Government Act 1972 came into effect, the southern part of Gloucestershire, including the district of Patchway, became part of the new county of Avon. Avon was disbanded in 1996, with the region now governed by South Gloucestershire council.

British Rail was split into business-led sectors in the 1980s, at which time operations at Patchway passed to Regional Railways. When the railway was privatised in 1997, local services were franchised to Wales & West, which was succeeded by Wessex Trains, an arm of National Express, in 2001. The Wessex franchise was amalgamated with the Great Western franchise into the Greater Western franchise from 2006, and responsibility passed to First Great Western, a subsidiary company of FirstGroup, and rebranded as Great Western Railway in 2015. From December 2006, Virgin CrossCountry began operating a single daily service Newcastle to Cardiff Central via Bristol Temple Meads and Patchway.

Since the mid-2000s, the Severnside Community Rail Partnership have been working to enhance Patchway station. One of the first acts was installing new community notice boards. A local working group was formed to "adopt" the station, and the group negotiated with Rolls-Royce to use their CCTV system to cover the station. A successful bid was made to the Department for Transport's "Access for All" scheme, which provided for improved signage, lighting and seats. A station garden was created in partnership with nearby Patchway Community College, and two decorative mosaics were installed. The disused railway land adjacent to the station was cleared through a Community Payback scheme.

As part of work to electrify the line passing through the station, the footbridge was replaced. A new accessible footbridge with lifts at either side was opened in May 2021.

Future 
The South Wales Main Line from London to Cardiff is due to be electrified by 2017, as is the line to Bristol Temple Meads. The group Friends of Suburban Bristol Railways supports the electrification continuing to Weston, as does MP for Weston-super-Mare John Penrose.

See also
Rail services in Bristol
MetroWest

Notes

References

External links

Railway stations in Bristol, Bath and South Gloucestershire
Former Great Western Railway stations
Railway stations in Great Britain opened in 1863
South Wales Main Line
Railway stations served by Great Western Railway
DfT Category F1 stations